Eubetia is a genus of moths belonging to the family Tortricidae.

Species
Eubetia bigaulae Brown, 1999
Eubetia boop Brown, 1999

See also
List of Tortricidae genera

References

 , 1999, Journal of the New York entomological Society 106: 178.
 , 2005, World Catalogue of Insects 5

External links
tortricidae.com

Euliini
Tortricidae genera